Beyla is one of Freyr's servants along with her husband, Byggvir, in Norse mythology. Beyla is mentioned in stanzas 55, 66, and the prose introduction to the Poetic Edda poem Lokasenna. Since this is the only mention of Beyla, scholars have turned to the etymology of Beyla's name for additional information about her. However, the meaning of her name is unclear and her name has been proposed as related to "cow," "bean," or "bee."

Lokasenna
In the prose introduction to Lokasenna,  Beyla and Byggvir are cited as attending In stanza 55 of Lokasenna, after his verses with Sif,  Loki accuses Beyla of being filthy but the reason for this is unclear. 

Stanza 55:

Stanza 56:

In relation to Loki's comments in Lokasenna, proposals have been made that Beyla and her husband are personifications of agriculture associated with Freyr: Beyla as the manure that softens the earth and develops the seed, Byggvir as the refuse of the mill, chaff.

Notes

References in Popular Culture
 Beyla is one of the monster bosses for the Fjordur DLC in the Ark: Survival Evolved video game
 Beyla appears as a supporting character in the 2022 game, God of War Ragnarök. In the game, she is depicted as a Dark Elf who has married a Light Elf Byggvir and is part of Freyr's resistance group in Vanaheim.

References

 Lindow, John (2001). Norse Mythology: A Guide to the Gods, Heroes, Rituals, and Beliefs. Oxford University Press. 
 Thorpe, Benjamin (1851). Northern Mythology Vol. I. London: Edward Lumley

Freyr
Servants in Norse mythology
Personifications in Norse mythology
Manure

ja:ビュグヴィルとベイラ#ベイラ